Avoca was an electoral district of the Legislative Assembly in the Australian state of Victoria from 1859 to 1889. It was based in northern Victoria. It was defined by the 1858 Electoral Act as: 
 McNeil's Creek now known as Bet Bet Creek.

In April 1889, a new district, Talbot and Avoca, was created.

Members

      # = by-election

References

External links
Electoral district of Avoca Map at State Library of Victoria

Former electoral districts of Victoria (Australia)
1859 establishments in Australia
1889 disestablishments in Australia